Hendrick Conrad Joannes Heusken (January 20, 1832 – January 15, 1861) was a Dutch-American interpreter for the first American consulate in Japan, established at Gyokusen-ji in Shimoda, Shizuoka in the late Bakumatsu period. He played an important role in the negotiations for the "Harris Treaty", which opened commercial relations between Japan and America, and his assassination caused a minor diplomatic crisis between Japan and the various Western powers.

Life
Heusken was born in Amsterdam to Joannes Franciscus Heusken, who worked for a soap manufacturer, and Johanna Smit. 
The death of his father jeopardized his chances of a successful career, so he immigrated to the United States and became a naturalized citizen, changing his name to Henry Conrad Joannes Heusken. However, he found that life in New York City was difficult as well, and was forced to move from job to job based on his contacts with the local Dutch community. In 1855, these same contacts introduced him to Townsend Harris, who had been appointed for the first United States Consul General to Japan, and who was looking for a personal assistant and interpreter in the only European language the Japanese were familiar with.

Harris reported to Washington in his official reports that Heusken was kind and amiable in temper, never showing violence to the Japanese, and a universal favorite. However, in his personal diary, Harris complained that Heusken was lackadaisical, stating "I believe that Mr Heusken only remembers when to eat, drink and sleep – any other affairs rest lightly on his memory"  On other occasions, Harris sought to warn Heusken about his late hours.

After the American consulate was relocated to Zenpuku-ji in Edo, Heusken quickly became one of the most publicly visible foreigners among the multiple western delegations in Edo. He frequently rode about the town and castle on horseback, a privilege that was traditionally reserved for the samurai caste. Count Friedrich Albrecht zu Eulenburg, head of the Eulenburg Expedition which was in Japan for the purpose of negotiating a commercial treaty between Prussia and Japan similar to treaties secured by the other European powers, requested that Harris loan Heusken to serve as interpreter during the negotiations.

After having dinner with Count Eulenburg on the night of 14 January 1861, Heusken was returning to his quarters at Zenpuku-ji accompanied by three mounted officers and four footmen bearing lanterns. The party was suddenly ambushed by seven shishi from Satsuma Domain, including . Despite his escort, Heusken suffered mortal wounds to both sides of his body in the fight. He mounted a horse and galloped about 200 yards to the American Legation, where he was taken inside and treated. Early in the following morning, he died of his wounds. Since he was a Dutch citizen despite his employment at the US Consulate, his friend and Dutch Consul Dirk de Graeff van Polsbroek traveled from Kanagawa to arrange his estate. Harris insisted on an ostentatiously large funeral procession, with the participation of all the foreign missions in Japan, and Heusken was buried at the cemetery at Korin-ji in Tokyo, Japan.

Immediately after the funeral, most western diplomats retreated from Edo to Yokohama and brought ashore greater numbers of French and British soldiers for protection as trade dwindled. The "yet unpunished and unatoned homicide of Mr. Heusken" was cited by William H. Seward as a hindering factor in relations between the U.S. and Japan during this period. No one was ever convicted of the murder, and the only reparations made by the government of Japan was a $10,000 payment to Heusken's mother.

Heusken wrote a detailed diary of his time in Japan, which was published in 1964 as "Japan Journal 1855-1861".

See also
List of Westerners who visited Japan before 1868
Sakoku

References

1832 births
1861 deaths
Dutch emigrants to the United States
Japan–United States relations
Interpreters
People from Amsterdam
People murdered in Japan
19th-century translators